also known as Mobile Suit Gundam Hathaway, is a series of novels created and written by Yoshiyuki Tomino. Officially part of the Gundam metaseries, it was first published by Kadokawa Shoten under the Kadokawa Sneaker Bunko label from  February 1, 1989 to April 1, 1990 with a total of three volumes. The story revolves around Hathaway Noa, who now goes by the name Mafty Navue Erin, as he starts a terrorist group to stop the abuses of the Earth Federation. The novel was notable for being the only semi-canonical Gundam work by Tomino. A three-part theatrical film adaptation was formally announced by Bandai Namco Filmworks (formerly known as Sunrise) as part of the "UC NexT 0100" project. The first film was released on June 11, 2021.

Plot
U.C. 0105, twelve years after the Second Neo Zeon War, the Earth Federation accepts the Republic of Zeon back in the fold. 
However, the Federation remained corrupt, with politicians, bureaucrats, and corporate executives enjoying their privileges while accelerating the pollution of the planet. And the inhumane "Man Hunter" units that forcibly deported underprivileged or undesirable civilians from around the world to the space colonies were more active than ever before.
Mafty, a terrorist organization, began resisting the Federation with a radical act of assassination of the people of the privileged class.
Its leader, Mafty Navue Erin, is actually Hathaway Noah, the son of Bright Noah, a hero of the Federation .
Still haunted by the death of Ques Paraya and reflecting on the actions and beliefs of Char and Amuro, Hathaway uses the new prototype the RX-105 Ξ Gundam (Xi Gundam, "Ksee Gundam") to purge the high officials of the Federation as if to dispel the gloom. 
In response, Kenneth Sleg of the Earth Federation Space Forces assembles the Circe Unit, led by Lane Aim piloting the RX-104FF Penelope in order to stop Mafty.
Hathaway tries to make her way as a warrior, but an encounter with Kenneth and a mysterious woman, Gigi Andalucia, changes his destiny.

Characters

Main Characters

 The son of the famous Bright Noa and a veteran pilot when Char tried to crash the Axis into Earth (see Char's Counterattack). However, Hathaway also happens to be Mafty Navue Erin, an infamous anti-Federation terrorist. He came down to Earth with permission to stay for the treatment of depression and training of botanical observer candidates, thanks in part to his father's fame. During the training, he learned about Mafty from an elderly man who visited his supervisor, Professor Amada Mansan, under the alias "Quack Salver", and decides to join the group. As its current leader, he pilots the RX-105 Ξ Gundam.

 A mysterious, eccentric, and wealthy young woman who seemingly has the ability to see through lies. 

 A Federation captain and the chief of security for Davao. He forms the Circe Unit whose sole purpose is to hunt down Mafty.

Mafty

 A member of Mafty as part of its technical staff.

 A member of Mafty and one of the group's Mobile Suit pilots.

 A member of Mafty and one of its pilots.

 A member of Mafty and one of its pilots. 

 A member of Mafty and one of its pilots. 

 A member of Mafty and one of its pilots. 

 A member of Mafty and one of its pilots.

 A member of Mafty.

 Hathaway's girlfriend. She devoted herself to his rehab and even became Mafty's district supporter to be by his side. However, ironically, as he became a core combatant and immersed himself in Mafty activities, she gradually became estranged.

 An elderly man who goes by the codename "Quack Salver". He is a supporter of Mafty and is the mastermind behind the formation of an anti-Earth Federation organization calling for the purge of the privileged classes and the preservation of the Earth's environment, centered on a fictional figure named Mufti Navue Erin. He provides logistical support to the execution teams led by Hathaway, who continues to carry out terrorist attacks as he moves across the Pacific.
 He was once a general in the Earth Front of the Earth Federation Forces. He is now rumored to be a key figure in the Earth Federation government.
 A quack-salver is a false name synonymous with a bogus doctor or other fraudulent person.

Earth Federation Forces

 Leader of the Earth Federation's Circe Unit, who pilots the RX-104 Penelope.

Earth Federation government

Davao Criminal Police Organization

 The chief of the Davao Criminal Police Organization.

Others

Media

Novel
Hathaway's Flash was first conceived by Yoshiyuki Tomino in 1988 following the production of Mobile Suit Gundam: Char's Counterattack film. However, Hathaway's Flash is meant more as a sequel to the novel Beltorchika's Children, the second/third novel version of Char's Counterattack. Moriki Yasuhiro provided the mobile suit designs while character illustrator Haruhiko Mikimoto joined the project as character designer. The first novel of the series was released on February 1, 1989, the second on March 1, 1990 and the third and final one released on April 1, 1990. All three novels were released under the Kadokawa Sneaker Bunko label.

Manga
A manga adaptation by Uroaki Sabashi, that serves as a sequel to Uroaki's manga adaptation of Beltorchika's Children, began serialization in Gundam Ace on April 26, 2021, after the prologue was released on March 26, 2020.

Films
A three-part film adaptation by Bandai Namco Filmworks (formerly known as Sunrise) was first teased back in April 2018 upon the unveiling of Mobile Suit Gundam Narrative. The film was later formally announced during the Gundam 40th Anniversary press conference in November of the same year. The first film was originally scheduled to released on July 23, 2020, but it was delayed to May 7, 2021 due to the COVID-19 pandemic. The film was delayed again to May 21, 2021. A third delay was announced on May 17, with a new date not set at the time. The film was finally released on June 11, 2021 in theaters in Japan and China. Netflix obtained streaming rights for the first film, which was released on July 1, 2021 in select territories. A second film in the series was teased after the first film's release. The films are directed by Shūkō Murase, with Yasuyuki Mutou writing scripts. [Alexandros] performs the film's main theme . Hiroyuki Sawano
composed the music for all three films.

Yoshiyuki Tomino stated on interview that "30 years after I wrote those novels, they are finally being adapted into film. As the author, I am so happy". He also noted that "The real world hasn't progressed, and may even have regressed. Because of all the Gundam fans who gave this story the chance to reemerge, its themes can pierce through society today."

Video games
Hathaway's Flash  first appeared in the SD Gundam G Generation series of games by Bandai starting with SD Gundam G Generation F. The series later made its Super Robot Wars debut in Super Robot Wars V in 2017.

Merchandise
The titular character mecha (Ξ Gundam) was released as part of Bandai's Gundam Fix Figuration line of toys starting in 2005. The title later got its own Gunpla debut, with the BB Seishi No.386 Ξ Gundam in December 2013, the High Grade Universal Century Gustav Karl in February 2019, which were released under the Gundam Unicorn line, the High Grade Universal Century Penelope, released in November 2019, the High Grade Universal Century Messer Type F01, released in July 2020 and the High Grade Universal Century Ξ Gundam, released in April 2021.

Reception
Richard Eisenbeis of Anime News Network gave the first film a B, citing the film's "beautiful but hampered by some of its creative choices" and criticizing its overall plot saying that "with a bit more finesse in execution, it could have been a far better adaptation than what it has turned out to be." In its first theatrical release, the first film earned more than 524 million yen in its first weekend. It later earned 1,016,249,400 yen, making it the first Gundam film to top the 1 billion yen mark since Char's Counterattack 33 years before.

Notes

References

External links
  
 

1989 Japanese novels
Science fiction anime and manga
Gundam anime and manga
Sunrise (company)
Kadokawa Sneaker Bunko
Novels about terrorism
Shōnen manga
Anime films composed by Hiroyuki Sawano
Anime postponed due to the COVID-19 pandemic
Films about terrorism
Films set in the Philippines
Eco-terrorism in fiction